Hush is a South Korean television series starring Hwang Jung-min and Im Yoon-ah. Based on the 2018 novel Silence Warning by Jung Jin-young, it aired on JTBC from December 11, 2020 to February 6, 2021.

Synopsis
Hush tells the story of office workers at a newsroom.

Cast

Main
 Hwang Jung-min as Han Joon-hyuk
 Im Yoon-ah as Lee Ji-soo

Supporting
 Son Byong-ho as Na Sung-won
 Kim Jae-chul as Park Myung-hwan
 Yoo Sun as Yang Yoon-kyung
 Jung Joon-won as Choi Kyung-woo
 Lee Ji-hoon as Yoon Sang-gyu
 Kim Won-hae as Jung Se-joon
 Park Ho-san as Uhm Sung-han
 Lee Seung-joon as Kim Gi-ha
 Baek Joo-hee as Lee Jae-eun
 Choi Kang-soo as Jo Dong-wook
 Kyung Soo-jin as Oh Soo-yeon
 Im Sung-jae as Kang Joo-an
 Lee Ji-hyun as Madame Kang
 Lee Seung-woo as Hong Gyu-tae

Production
The series marks Hwang Jung-min's small screen comeback after 8 years.

Episodes

Original soundtrack

Part 1

Part 2

Part 3

Part 4

Viewership

Notes

References

External links
  
 
 

JTBC television dramas
Korean-language television shows
2020 South Korean television series debuts
2021 South Korean television series endings
Television shows based on South Korean novels
Television series by KeyEast
Television series about journalism
Television series about television
Television productions suspended due to the COVID-19 pandemic
Television series by JTBC Studios
South Korean workplace television series